Leiknir Jónsson (born 22 October 1943) is an Icelandic former breaststroke swimmer. He competed in two events at the 1968 Summer Olympics.

References

External links
 

1943 births
Living people
Leiknir Jonsson
Leiknir Jonsson
Swimmers at the 1968 Summer Olympics
People from Patreksfjörður